Shoshenq C was the eldest son of the 22nd Dynasty pharaoh Osorkon I and queen Maatkare, and served as the High Priest of Amun at Thebes during his father's reign. Consequently, he was the most important official in Upper Egypt after the king himself. He has generally been equated with Heqakheperre Shoshenq II by the English Egyptologist Kenneth Kitchen and viewed as a short-lived co-regent to his father based on the Nile God British Museum statue 8 which identifies him as the son of Osorkon I and Queen Maatkare, daughter of Hor-Psusennes. In the statue, Shoshenq C is called "the Master of the Two Lands" and the formula "beloved of Amun" is enclosed within a royal cartouche. However, in the text of the statue, he is not given a specific throne name or prenomen, the use of a cartouche by a royal prince is attested in other periods of Egyptian history such as that of Amenmes, son of Thutmose I, and the documents depicts Shoshenq C as a simple High Priest of Amun on the side of the legs of the Nile God, rather than a king.

In addition, none of Shoshenq C's three wives used the title "King's Wife" in any of their artifacts. More significantly, none of his three children ever gave their father a royal title on their own funerary objects such as a Priest Osorkon, whose funerary papyri is now in the St. Petersburg Museum of History, or the God's Wife Karomama Meritmut. Finally,  Shoshenq C's third child—the priest (and future king) Harsiese A does not assign royal titles to his father on a Bes-statue in Durham Museum which he dedicated to his father's memory. Instead, Shoshenq C is only "designated the 1st Prophet of Amun without other [royal] titles." Hence, Jacquet Gordon's observation: if Shoshenq C had even "the slightest pretensions to royal rank, his son [Harsiese] would not have omitted to mention...[this] fact. We must therefore conclude that he (ie: Shoshenq C) had no such pretensions." All this evidence taken together suggest that the High Priest Shoshenq C was not a king in his own right and is not Shoshenq II, whose Royal tomb was found intact in Tanis.

As an aside, king Shoshenq II did not include any mementos or objects which mention Osorkon I within his own tomb. This is an improbable situation if he was indeed a son of this king who predeceased—and thus was buried by—his father, Osorkon I. The only other king mentioned by artifacts in Shoshenq II's tomb was Shoshenq I. Other Dynasty 22 kings, such as Takelot I, employed funerary goods naming their parents in their own tombs. The High Priest Shoshenq C was probably succeeded in office by Iuwelot, who was also another son of Osorkon I. Shoshenq C's son, Harsiese, later ruled over Thebes and Middle Egypt as king Harsiese A.

There is a high degree of academic uncertainty regarding the parentage of Shoshenq II: some scholars today argue that this ruler was actually a younger son of Shoshenq I due to the discovery of items naming the founder of the 22nd Dynasty in his royal Tanite tomb such as "a pectoral of the great chief of the Ma Shoshenq A, and a bracelet of Shoshenq I." Karl Jansen-Winkeln concludes thus: "The commonly assumed identification of this king with the (earlier) HP and son of Osorkon I does not appear to be very probable." Other scholars, including Jürgen von Beckerath and Norbert Dautzenberg, view the High Priest Shoshenq C as an entirely separate ruler who ruled over Thebes and Upper Egypt as king Maatkheperre Shoshenq; this Libyan Pharaoh had statue Cairo CG 42192 rededicated and reinscribed. They consequently distinguish him entirely from king Heqakheperre Shoshenq II at Tanis.

References

Theban High Priests of Amun
People of the Twenty-second Dynasty of Egypt
10th-century BC clergy
9th-century BC clergy